The dynastic race theory was the earliest thesis to attempt to explain how predynastic Egypt developed into the sophisticated monarchy of Dynastic Egypt. The theory holds that the earliest roots of the ancient Egyptian dynastic civilisation were imported by invaders from Mesopotamia who then founded the First Dynasty and brought culture to the indigenous population. This theory had strong supporters in the Egyptological community in the first half of the 20th century, but has since lost mainstream support.

Origins
In the early 20th century, Egyptologist Sir William Matthew Flinders Petrie deduced that skeletal remains found at pre-dynastic sites at Naqada (Upper Egypt) indicated the presence of two different races, with the Dynastic Race, also referred to as the "Followers of Horus", differentiated physically by a noticeably larger skeletal structure and cranial capacity. Petrie concluded that the physical differences of the remains in conjunction with the previously unknown burial styles, uncharacteristic tomb architecture, and abundance of foreign artifacts, implied this race must have been an invading ruling elite that was responsible for the seemingly sudden rise of Egyptian civilization. Based on plentiful cultural evidence, Petrie determined that the invader race had come from Mesopotamia, and imposed themselves on the native Badarian culture to become their rulers. Petrie adduced new architectural styles—the distinctly Mesopotamian "niched-facade" architecture—pottery styles, cylinder seals and a few artworks, as well as numerous Predynastic rock and tomb paintings depicting Mesopotamian style boats, symbols, and figures.

This came to be called the "dynastic race theory" The theory further argued that the Mesopotamians then conquered both Upper and Lower Egypt and founded the First Dynasty. Predynastic and First Dynasty burial sites similar to Naqada were also found at Abydos, Sakkara, and Hieraconpolis.

Versions of the Dynastic race model were adopted by scholars as L. A. Waddell, and Walter Bryan Emery, a former Chair of Egyptology at University College London.

Decline
The dynastic race theory is no longer an accepted thesis in the field of predynastic archaeology. While there is clear evidence the Naqada II culture borrowed abundantly from Mesopotamia, the most commonly held view today is that the achievements of the First Dynasty were the result of a long period of cultural and political development. Such borrowings are much older than the Naqada II period, the Naqada II period had a large degree of continuity with the Naqada I period, and the changes which did happen during the Naqada periods happened over significant amounts of time.

Modern Egyptology largely maintains the view that "state formation occurred as a mainly indigenous process", although significant differences in morphology indicated migration along the Nile Valley also took place. The Dynastic Race theory has been largely replaced by the theory Egypt was a hydraulic empire.

In Afrocentrism
In the 1950s, when the Dynastic Race Theory was widely accepted by mainstream scholarship, the Senegalese scholar Cheikh Anta Diop was publicising his theory that the Ancient Egyptians were "Black Africans." Diop "paid special attention to the emergence of the Dynastic Race Theory", and claimed that European scholars supported this theory to avoid having to admit that the Ancient Egyptians were black and to characterise them as "Semitic" or "Caucasian". Other prominent Afrocentrists, including Martin Bernal, later also argued against the dynastic race theory in favour of a "Black Egyptian" model. Afrocentrists particularly condemn the alleged dividing of African peoples into racial clusters as being new versions of the Dynastic Race Theory and the Hamitic hypothesis.

Revival
A version of the theory has been revived by some modern scholars, most notably David Rohl, and Michael Rice, who have advanced reasons in support of a Mesopotamian origin of Dynastic Egypt in books such as Rohl's Legend-The Genesis of Civilisation and Rice's Egypt's Making.

According to Rohl, "There is little evidence of kingship and its rituals very much before the beginning of the 1st Dynasty; no signs of the gradual development of metal working, art, monumental architecture and writing—the defining criteria of early civilisation. Much of what we know about the pharaohs and their complex culture seems to come into existence in a flash of inspiration." Rohl believes the catalyst for this sudden development was the influx of a Mesopotamian "foreign elite" who made their way to Egypt by sailing around the coastline of the Arabian Peninsula into the Red Sea ultimately dragging their boats across the desert to the Nile. Rohl notes numerous pre-dynastic rock carvings found in several locations from Wadi Abbad to Abydos which is suggested depict large Mesopotamian style boats with crews of up to 75, some of which appear being pulled across land. Rohl believes the most dramatic evidence to support this theory is the sudden introduction of distinctly Mesopotamian "niched-facade", also known as "palace facade", architecture found in several early Dynastic sites, most notably the large 1st Dynasty mastabas at Saqqara. A depiction of a building using this kind of architecture is also an integral part of the serekh, the early Egyptian seal of kingship, and is found before the 1st Dynasty as well in the Naqada III, or "Dynasty 0" period. He says, "It is highly improbable that such specialized building techniques were independently invented in two widely separated regions at the same historical period without cultural transmission. 
        
In addition to the evidence available to Petrie et al., proponents also point out similarities in the names of divinities and places in the religious beliefs of the two cultures, and in depictions of regalia. For example the primeval mound of the Egyptian first creation was called the Island of Nun, and was surrounded by the Waters of Nun, while the Sumerian name for the great temple in their original city of Eridu was Nun.ki—the 'Mighty Place'—and it was built on an island in the reed swamps. Several scholars have also noted that the name Osiris is a Greek pronunciation, and that the god would have been called Asar in Egyptian, while the Sumerian god of the Eridu area was also called Asar (the Babylonian Marduk.). The Uruk period of Ancient Mesopotamia (4100–2900 BC calibrated) predates the Naqada II period of Ancient Egypt (3500-3200 BC) and indeed there is evidence of colonies of this Uruk civilization over a wide area—from the Taurus Mountains, to the Mediterranean Sea in the west, and as far east as Central Iran.

See also
Ancient Egyptian race controversy

References

Egyptology
Historical definitions of race
Origin hypotheses of ethnic groups
Prehistoric Egypt
Ancient Egyptian race controversy
Badarian culture
Archaeology and racism